Herkules may refer to:

 Junkers Ju 352 Herkules, a German World War II transport aircraft
 Operation Herkules, a proposed World War II invasion of Malta by the Axis
 Maschinenfabrik Herkules, a German manufacturer of machine tools
 IF Herkules, a Norwegian multi-sports club in Skien, Telemark
 Jerzy Radziwiłł (1480–1541), Polish–Lithuanian nobleman nicknamed "Herkules"
 , an Austro-Hungarian Navy salvage ship - see List of ships of Austria-Hungary
 Herkules, a type of sonar equipping the Arnala-class corvette
 Herkules, a towboat/museum ship in Västergötland, Gothenburg, Sweden - see List of museum ships
 Herkules, a variety of hop - see List of hop varieties

See also
 Hercules (disambiguation)